The Great Divergence is a term given to a period, starting in the late 1970s, during which income differences increased in the US and, to a lesser extent, in other countries. The term originated with the Nobel laureate, Princeton economist and New York Times columnist Paul Krugman, and is a reference to the "Great Compression", an earlier era in the 1930s and the 1940s when incomes became more equal in the US and elsewhere.

A 2017 report by the Congressional Budget Office on the distribution of income in the US from 1979 to 2007 found that after federal taxes and income transfers, the top earning 1% of households gained about 275% and that the bottom 20% grew by only 41%. As of 2006, the US had one of the highest levels of income inequality, as measured through the Gini index, among similar developed or First World countries. 

Scholars and others differ as the causes and significance of the divergence, which helped ignite the Occupy movement in 2011. While education and increased demand for skilled labour is often cited as a cause of increased inequality, especially among conservatives, many social scientists point to conservative politics, neoliberal economic and social policies and public policy as an important cause of inequality; others believe its causes are not well understood. Inequality has been described both as irrelevant in the face of economic opportunity (or social mobility) in America and as a cause of the decline in that opportunity.

Others consider that the exodus of manufacturing jobs from industrialized countries since the 1990s has been another defining factor. For instance, the journalist James Surowiecki pointed out in a 2013 article for The New Yorker how in 50 years "big business" had changed from high-paying manufacturers to low-paying retailers
 In 1960, the country's biggest employer, General Motors, was also its most profitable company and one of its best-paying. It had high profit margins and real pricing power, even as it was paying its workers union wages. And it was not alone: firms like Ford, Standard Oil, and Bethlehem Steel employed huge numbers of well-paid workers while earning big profits. Today, the country's biggest employers are retailers and fast-food chains, almost all of which have built their businesses on low pay—they've striven to keep wages down and unions out—and low prices. 
While these retailers and fast-food chains are profitable, their profit margins are not large, which limits their ability to follow the lead of successful companies in high-growth industries that pay relatively generous salaries, such as Apple Inc.The combined profits of all the major retailers, restaurant chains, and supermarkets in the Fortune 500 are smaller than the profits of Apple alone. Yet Apple employs just 76,000 people, while the retailers, supermarkets, and restaurant chains employ 5.6 million.

The International Labour Organization's 2013 "World of Work Report", predicted that the potential for social unrest in the European Union is the highest in the world.

See also

 Economic history of the United States
 Economic inequality
 Economic stagnation
 The End of Work
 Socioeconomic mobility in the United States
 Wealth inequality in the United States

References

Economic inequality
Income in the United States